Project Cetus is a crewless submarine being developed by the United Kingdom.

Named after cetus, a mythological sea monster, the project is funded by the Anti-Submarine Warfare Spearhead programme, run by the Royal Navy's “Develop Directorate” from their headquarters in Portsmouth, and delivered through the Submarine Delivery Agency in Bristol. Submarines are designed and constructed by tech company MSubs, which is based in Plymouth.

Gallery

References 

Unmanned underwater vehicles
Submarines of the United Kingdom